Frank Gamble (born 1871, date of death unknown) was a footballer who played in The Football League as an inside forward for Sheffield United.

Born in Worksop in Nottinghamshire, Gamble was playing for Sheffield side Heeley when he came to the attention of Sheffield United. United had just been accepted into the newly formed Second Division and registered Gamble as a guest player for the 1892–93 season.  He made little impact, spending most of his time either in the reserves or playing for his parent club, making only one competitive start for the Blades in a Northern League fixture against Stockton.

Gamble was not retained by either United or Heeley at the end of that season and he subsequently spent a year playing for his home town club Worksop Town.  Despite his lack of impact during his previous spell with Sheffield United they signed him for a second time in the summer of 1894, this time on a permanent contract. He spent two further seasons with the club but once again failed to make much impact, playing only three league games in two years.  United lost all four competitive fixtures that Gamble had played for them in his two spells and his career at Bramall Lane was curtailed when he missed the train to Birmingham having been selected to play in a fixture there, after which he made only one more reserve appearance before being released.

Leaving United once more Gamble drifted back into the amateur game with short spells at Oldham County and a brief return to Worksop Town.  He then spent a season at each of Ilkeston Town, Wombwell Town and Mexborough before retiring.

References

Footballers from Worksop
1871 births
Year of death unknown
English footballers
Association football forwards
Heeley F.C. players
Sheffield United F.C. players
Worksop Town F.C. players
Oldham County F.C. players
Ilkeston Town F.C. (1880s) players
Wombwell Town F.C. (1890s) players
Mexborough F.C. players
Northern Football League players
English Football League players